George G. Brew (1868 – January 31, 1937) was a member of the Wisconsin State Assembly.

Biography
Brew was born in Milwaukee, Wisconsin in 1868. He later moved to Greenfield, Wisconsin.

He died on January 31, 1937.

Career
Brew was elected to the Assembly in 1908. In 1910, he was a candidate for the Wisconsin State Senate, losing to Gabriel Zophy. Additionally, Brew was Village President (similar to Mayor) of West Milwaukee, Wisconsin. He was a Republican.

References

Politicians from Milwaukee
People from Greenfield, Wisconsin
Republican Party members of the Wisconsin State Assembly
Mayors of places in Wisconsin
1868 births
1937 deaths
People from West Milwaukee, Wisconsin